Tor.com is an online science fiction and fantasy magazine published by Tor Books, a division of Macmillan Publishers. The magazine publishes articles, reviews, original short fiction, re-reads and commentary on speculative fiction.

From 2014 to 2020, Tor.com was also the name of an imprint of Tor Books publishing science fiction and fantasy novels and novellas. In 2020, the imprint was renamed Tordotcom.

History
The magazine was established in July 2008 and, as of 2014, reported having 1.5 million readers each month. It publishes articles and reviews related to English language science fiction and other speculative fiction, as well as original short science fiction.  Unlike traditional print magazines like Asimov's or Analog, it releases online fiction that can be accessed free of charge.

Reception

Gardner Dozois called Tor.com "one of the coolest and most eclectic genre-oriented sites on the Internet". He felt in 2011 that its short fiction output that year was weaker than usual, but said it was still a fascinating place to visit. In 2014, The Guardian Damien Walter remarked on a "digital renaissance" in short SF, and cited a new generation of online magazines, including Lightspeed, Strange Horizons, Tor.com and Escape Pod, as having transformed the genre. Of these, he described Tor.com as "the reigning champion of science-fiction magazines". He noted the broad range of its output, and said that it had published "many of the most exciting new talents" such as Maria Dahvana Headley and Karin Tidbeck. 

In 2018, Dozois noted that there had been a dramatic resurgence in novellas, with more than 80 published, and attributed the development to Tor.com publishing's "ambitious new program". The same year, The Verge Andrew Liptak called Tor.com the publisher of "sci-fi’s most innovative stories", noting the critical acclaim of its output such as Nnedi Okorafor’s Binti and Martha Wells’ Murderbot series, which have won Hugo and Nebula Awards.

Awards

Tor.com has won six Locus Awards for Best Magazine (2015, 2017–21), breaking a 40-year-long streak where the category was only won by Asimov's and F&SF (in addition to Locus itself). For its art direction, Irene Gallo received the 2014 World Fantasy Award for Professional Work.

There have also been several award-winning collections of Tor.com content. Reviews and commentary by Jo Walton were collected in the books What Makes This Book So Great and An Informal History of the Hugos, with the former winning the 2014 Locus Award for Best Non-Fiction, and the latter nominated for the 2019 Hugo and Locus Awards. The fiction anthology, Worlds Seen in Passing: 10 Years of Tor.com Short Fiction, won the 2019 World Fantasy Award for Best Anthology.

References

Sources

 
 

Speculative fiction magazines published in the United States
Magazines established in 2008
Science fiction webzines
2008 establishments in the United States
Speculative fiction websites
Fantasy fiction magazines